The Peabody Mountains is a mountain range in southeastern Alaska located between the lower Portland Canal and the Marten River. It has an area of 1387 km2 and is a subrange of the Boundary Ranges which in turn form part of the Coast Mountains.
The range is located entirely within Misty Fjords National Monument.

See also
List of mountain ranges

References

Boundary Ranges
Mountains of Ketchikan Gateway Borough, Alaska